The 2012–13 Kuwait Crown Prince Cup is a cup competition involving teams from the Kuwaiti Premier League and the Kuwaiti Division One league. The competition has continued to be played in the beginning of the season but has reverted to a knockout tournament played over two legs. The previous edition was played in a group staged round robin format.

Al Arabi are the defending champions and enter at the second round stage (quarter-finals) along with league winners Al Qadsia.

First round

|}

Quarter finals

|}

Semi finals

|}

Final

|}

Kuwait Crown Prince Cup
Kuwait Crown Prince Cup, 2012-13
Kuwait Crown Prince Cup, 2012-13